is a Metroidvania Touhou Project fangame developed in 2009 for Microsoft Windows. The game has also been referred to as Touhouvania. A remaster, titled , was announced in 2021, and released on July 28, 2022 for Steam and Nintendo Switch.

Gameplay 
Koumajou Densetsu: Scarlet Symphony is a Metroidvania, taking heavy influence from Castlevania: Symphony of the Night. The player controls Reimu Hakurei, the miko of the Hakurei Shrine, as she navigates the Scarlet Devil Mansion via platforming sections and killing enemies and bosses, which allows Reimu to level up and upgrade her abilities.

Plot 
In Koumajou Densetsu: Scarlet Symphony, Reimu Hakurei enters the Scarlet Devil Mansion to stop Remilia Scarlet, who has released red mist across Gensokyo.

Development 
Koumajou Densetsu: Scarlet Symphony was released in August 2009 by dojin developer Frontier Aja at that year's Comiket. A remaster by the original developers was announced in 2021 for Steam and Nintendo Switch, which was originally intended to release the same year, but was later delayed to July 28, 2022. The remaster introduced new dialogue along with recorded voice acting, an official English translation, and improved graphics.

Sequel 
In 2010, a sequel was released, titled Koumajou Densetsu II: Stranger’s Requiem. In Koumajou Densetsu II, the player controls Sakuya Izayoi, the Scarlet Devil Mansion's maid. Unlike the first game, the level design is linear, and the game is divided into multiple stages, each with a boss at the end. Koumajou Densetsu II's gameplay is more characteristic of the earlier Castlevania games, such as Super Castlevania IV and Castlevania: Rondo of Blood. Lifted directly from the early Castlevania games, Sakuya can equip one of several sub-weapons, which attack at different angles to the regular attack, but require 'energy', located at various points throughout the stage, in order to use them.

References

External links 
Official website (in Japanese)

2009 video games
2010 video games
2022 video games
Nintendo Switch games
Video game remasters
Windows games
Video games developed in Japan
Metroidvania games
Fangames
Touhou Project games